Mound City is a town in and the county seat of Campbell County, South Dakota, United States. The population was 69 at the 2020 census.

History
Mound City was so named on account of the Indian mounds near the original town site.

Geography
Mound City is located at  (45.725799, -100.069562).

Mound City has been assigned the ZIP code 57646 and the FIPS place code 44020.

Demographics

2010 census
As of the census of 2010, there were 71 people, 40 households, and 21 families residing in the town. The racial makeup of the town was 98.6% White and 1.4% from two or more races.

There were 40 households, of which 10.0% had children under the age of 18 living with them, 45.0% were married couples living together, 7.5% had a male householder with no wife present, and 47.5% were non-families. 42.5% of all households were made up of individuals, and 25% had someone living alone who was 65 years of age or older. The average household size was 1.78 and the average family size was 2.24.

The median age in the town was 59.3 years. 5.6% of residents were under the age of 18; 5.6% were between the ages of 18 and 24; 12.6% were from 25 to 44; 32.4% were from 45 to 64; and 43.7% were 65 years of age or older. The gender makeup of the town was 54.9% male and 45.1% female.

2000 census
As of the census of 2000, there were 84 people, 43 households, and 30 families residing in the town. The population density was 646.8 people per square mile (249.5/km2). There were 54 housing units at an average density of 415.8 per square mile (160.4/km2). The racial makeup of the town was 95.24% White, 3.57% Native American, and 1.19% from two or more races.

There were 43 households, out of which 9.3% had children under the age of 18 living with them, 58.1% were married couples living together, 4.7% had a female householder with no husband present, and 30.2% were non-families. 27.9% of all households were made up of individuals, and 16.3% had someone living alone who was 65 years of age or older. The average household size was 1.95 and the average family size was 2.33.

In the town, the population was spread out, with 9.5% under the age of 18, 2.4% from 18 to 24, 14.3% from 25 to 44, 34.5% from 45 to 64, and 39.3% who were 65 years of age or older. The median age was 60 years. For every 100 females, there were 95.3 males. For every 100 females age 18 and over, there were 100.0 males.

The median income for a household in the town was $24,375, and the median income for a family was $25,536. Males had a median income of $13,750 versus $23,125 for females. The per capita income for the town was $12,387. There were no families and 9.2% of the population living below the poverty line, including no under eighteens and 16.3% of those over 64.

Notable people
 Claude Henry Allen, Minnesota politician and lawyer
 Alice Kundert, South Dakota politician

See also
 List of towns in South Dakota

References

External links

Towns in Campbell County, South Dakota
Towns in South Dakota
County seats in South Dakota